Route 4 is an east–west primary state highway connecting rural Litchfield County to the Greater Hartford area of the U.S. state of Connecticut. It runs  from the town of Sharon to the town of West Hartford.

Route description

Route 4 begins at the junction of Route 41 and Route 343 in Sharon as a rural, minor arterial road. In Cornwall, it briefly overlaps with US 7 to cross the Housatonic River on the Cornwall Bridge.  Farther east in Cornwall, it intersects with Routes 125, 43, and 128 before crossing into  Goshen.  In Goshen, it meets Route 63 at a roundabout in the center of town.  After entering Torrington, the road becomes more of a principal arterial road upon meeting the southern end of Route 272.  After skirting the northern edge of downtown, it meets the Route 8 freeway at exit 44 and briefly overlaps with US 202 just east of the interchange.  The road turns southeast and returns to more of a rural character, meeting the southern end of Route 183 before entering Harwinton, where it turns easterly at the junction with the eastern end of Route 118.  Shortly thereafter, it meets the western end of Route 72.  In Burlington, it meets the northern end of Route 69 near the center of town and descends into the Farmington River valley before meeting the southern end of Route 179. After turning southeast, it follows the Farmington River and enters the town of Farmington where it crosses the river just before entering the village of Unionville.  From here to its eastern end, it becomes a suburban primary arterial road known as Farmington Avenue.  In the center of Unionville, Route 4 intersects Route 177 and it intersects the southern end of Route 167 on the east end of the village.  After crossing the Farmington River once again, it intersects Route 10 in the center of town.  The road then meets SR 508 which provides access to I-84 while Route 4 eastbound traffic continues through one of the state's few jughandles.  After passing the University of Connecticut Health Center, it enters the town of West Hartford.  State maintenance continues for another  to the intersection of Boulevard, where Route 4 ends and Farmington Avenue continues as a local road through West Hartford Center continuing into Hartford until ending at an intersection with Asylum Avenue just west of Union Station and I-84 exit 48/48A.

A  section in Harwinton around the Cooks Dam area and a  section in Sharon are designated state scenic roads.

History

Most of modern Route 4 was first improved as portions of various turnpikes in the 19th century. The section of modern Route 4 between Sharon and Cornwall Bridge was the Sharon and Cornwall Turnpike; from Cornwall Hollow to Torrington, it was part of the Goshen and Sharon Turnpike (which used West Cornwall Road and Route 128 between Sharon and Cornwall Hollow); the portion between Harwinton to Burlington was the eastern half of the Litchfield and Harwinton Turnpike (the western half is Route 118); and the portion from Farmington to West Hartford was part of the Farmington and Bristol Turnpike (which used George Washington Turnpike and Red Oak Hill Road between Burlington center and Route 10).

The road between Cornwall Bridge through Torrington to Collinsville in Canton (part of the Goshen and Sharon Turnpike and the Torrington Turnpike) was designated as State Highway 123 in 1922. The road from Collinsville to Farmington center was designated as State Highway 138 at the same time. Route 4 was created in 1932 from these two state highways, running as a continuation of old New York State Route 361 from Amenia, New York to Farmington at Route 10. In the Torrington area, Route 4 originally ran further north than it does today, along the current alignment of U.S. Route 202 from Torrington to Collinsville, then southward along modern Route 179 to Unionville, where it continued east on its current alignment. Route 4 was relocated in 1963 to its present-day route through the area, taking over part of Route 72 and part of Route 116 (now Route 118.

The Hartford and West Hartford Horse Railroad was incorporated in 1863 to run horsecar service on Farmington Avenue. It was later electrified and extended to Unionville as the Farmington Street Railway, following Farmington Avenue except for a small section of private right-of-way in eastern Farmington. It was acquired by the New York, New Haven and Hartford Railroad in 1909 and became part of the Connecticut Company Hartford Division in 1910. Streetcars on the line were replaced by buses on June 5, 1933.

The west end was truncated in 1966 to end at Route 41 and the section connecting to the state line was renumbered to Route 361 to match the New York route. New York has since turned its Route 361 over to the county. In the Hartford area, Farmington Avenue east of Route 10, from Farmington to downtown Hartford, used to be part of the original U.S. Route 6 alignment. When US 6 was rerouted in 1956, Farmington Avenue was assigned to an extended Route 4. The route designation was later truncated to end in West Hartford where state maintenance of the road ended.

Major intersections

See also

References

External links

Gribblenation - CT Route 4 end photos

004
Transportation in Hartford County, Connecticut
Transportation in Litchfield County, Connecticut
U.S. Route 202
U.S. Route 6